An animal sanctuary is a facility where animals are brought to live and to be protected for the rest of their lives. Pattrice Jones, co-founder of VINE Sanctuary defines an animal sanctuary as "a safe-enough place or relationship within the continuing hazards that menace everybody". In addition, sanctuaries are an experimental staging ground for transformative human–animal relations. There are five types of animal sanctuaries reflective of the species-belonging of the residents: 1) companion animal sanctuaries; 2) wildlife sanctuaries; 3) exotic animal sanctuaries;  4) farmed animal sanctuaries; and 5) cetacean sanctuaries.

Unlike animal shelters, sanctuaries do not seek to place animals with individuals or groups, instead maintaining each animal until their natural death (either from disease or from other animals in the sanctuary). However, they can offer rehoming services, which can include veterinarians' help. In some cases, an establishment may have characteristics of both a sanctuary and a shelter; for instance, some animals may be in residence temporarily until a good home is found and others may be permanent residents. The mission of sanctuaries is generally to be safe havens, where the animals receive the best care that the sanctuaries can provide. Animals are not bought, sold, or traded, nor are they used for animal testing. Additionally, no parts of nor secretions from the animals are commodified, such as eggs, wool, or milk. The resident animals are given the opportunity to behave as natural as possible in a protective environment.

Overview
What distinguishes a sanctuary from other institutions is the philosophy that the residents come first. In a sanctuary, every action is scrutinized for any trace of human benefit at the expense of non-human residents. Sanctuaries act on behalf of the animals, and the caregivers work under the notion that all animals in the sanctuary, human and non-human, are of equal importance.

Most sanctuaries are not open to the public in the sense of a zoo; that is, allowing unescorted public access to the facility. A legitimate sanctuary avoids activity that would place the animals in an unduly stressful situation. Most sanctuaries are also not government-funded and are usually nonprofit. Public help is accepted by sanctuaries in the form of volunteering, monetary contributions, donations of food and materials, spreading the word, and in some cases, adoption.

One of the most important missions of sanctuaries, beyond caring for the animals, is educating the public. The ultimate goal of many sanctuaries is to change the way that humans think of, and treat, non-human animals.

On the basis of the types of animals being cared for, sanctuaries are of five types:
 Companion animal sanctuaries
 Wildlife sanctuaries
 Exotic animal sanctuaries
 Farmed animal sanctuaries
 Cetacean sanctuaries

Farmed animal sanctuaries 
Farmed animal sanctuaries (FAS) provide care, shelter and advocacy of farmed animal species such as chickens, cows, goats, fish, horses, pig, turkeys, and sheep. The farm sanctuary layout tends to resemble traditional farms however functions differently. FAS as a movement began with Gene Baur, the co-founder of Farm Sanctuary, the first official farm sanctuary that opened in 1986. The daily tasks of a FAS involve the primary guardians, volunteers and at time visitors. Each day is structured by routines such as feeding, care and health procedures, as well as cleaning and maintenance. Points of conflict for sanctuaries include human intervention in matters of sterilizing animals and species segregation. Moreover, effective altruists have critiqued the efficiency of FAS's ability to reduce animal suffering as demonstrated in the "arithmetic of compassion," a utilitarian measure of advocacy that applies mathematical formulas to reduce the most suffering in light of individual lives. Jon Bockman of Animal Charity Evaluators, states, "expending too many resources on direct rescue results in less money directed toward education and a lower overall impact in helping animals, and all advocates should give consideration to this concern when deciding how best to help animals".

Education 
The educational role is a secondary role of FAS. Investing in transforming visitors' and volunteers' perspectives on animal agriculture is a key component of FAS, enlisting farmed animal residents as "ambassadors" of their species to serve a fundraiser role.

FAS models 
Sue Donaldson and Will Kymlicka have outlined two different types of FAS models. FAS can be distinguished by ascribing to either refuge and advocacy model or intentional community model.

Refuge- and advocacy-based models 
Refuge- and advocacy-based models are the most standard. These sanctuaries are found in traditional agricultural communities in part because of the physical and legal infrastructure. Six characteristics of this model include: duty of care, support for species-typical flourishing, recognition of individuality, non-exploitation, non-perpetuation, and awareness and advocacy. The latter characteristic has launched a series of questions into the effectiveness of the educational component of sanctuaries.

Intentional community model 
The intentional community model addresses the shortcomings of the standard sanctuary model by focusing on movement building that includes a spectrum of speciesist issues such as developing farmed animal veterinary care that exist outside of standard practices that have aimed at meeting animal agricultural interests. The six characteristics of the intentional community model include: belonging, absence of fixed hierarchical relationships, self-determination, citizenship, dependent agency, and scaffolded choices and reconfigured spaces. These characteristics redress some of the critiques of the refuge and advocacy model by grounding sanctuary practices in animal agency and expanding the geographical boundaries of where animals can live. Expanding the geographies in which farmed animals are found serve as a corrective to forming human-farmed animal friendships.

An example of the intentional sanctuary model can be found in the Microsanctuary Movement started by Rosemary and Justin Van Kleeck. The Microsanctuary Movement encourages city-dwellers to rescue farmed animals to expand what species are considered to be companion animals.

Similarly, Darren Chang, co-founder of the Riverdale Farm Sanctuary Project has launched a campaign to transform Riverdale Farms, an urban farm in Toronto into a FAS advocating for: 1) Animal Rescue, Refuge, and Advocacy, 2) Compassion and Nonviolence, 3) Ecological and Food Justice and Compassionate Interspecies Community.

Expanding beyond the traditional role of a safe haven for farmed animals, sanctuaries can also be understood as playing political roles in transforming the political and spatial lives of animal residents and their broader species communities leaning into pioneering a less-speciesist future.

Cetacean sanctuaries 
Cetacean sanctuaries are designed for autonomy and well-being, enabling as natural a life as possible in ocean water.  Lifetime of care is provided for these whales, dolphins, or porpoises. Like other wild animals who have spent much or all of their lives in zoos, cetaceans who have lived in marine parks for most or all of their lives are potentially poor candidates for reintroduction and, therefore, sanctuaries are an alternative to living on display or in entertainment facilities. Sanctuary site selection, as far as size, water quality, protection from hazards and weather events, and more, introduce unique considerations for finding a location. 

The need for cetacean sanctuaries is  quickly emerging due to shifting regulations and changes in public attitudes toward cetaceans in captivity.  With an estimated 3,600 cetaceans in captivity globally, the need for spacious natural ocean environments that provide feeding and care is increasing, as globally marine parks and aquariums move away from whales and dolphins in their facilities. A primary criticism of commercial facilities is that animals are expected to perform unnatural behaviors for audiences in spaces that are small and can’t adequately approximate a natural setting. 

The first cetacean sanctuary for belugas opened in August 2020 by SEA LIFE Trust, as two belugas "Little Grey" and "Little White" were transported 6,000 miles from an aquarium in China to the first open-water whale sanctuary for belugas in Iceland. The Whale Sanctuary Project is creating a coastal sanctuary for beluga whales and orcas in Port Hilford, Nova Scotia and plans to welcome their first residents in late 2023, assuming the project gets the required federal and provincial permits. The National Aquarium in Baltimore, Maryland, is seeking a Caribbean location to create a warm water seaside dolphin sanctuary to become the permanent home for the dolphins currently at their facility. And the Archipelagos Institute of Marine Conservation is planning to create the Aegean Marine Life Sanctuary for previously captive dolphins on the island of Lipsi, south of Samos in the eastern Aegean Sea. 

Like other animal sanctuaries, cetacean sanctuaries adhere to a set of principles that put the animals first above the needs of the public, researchers, donors or other stakeholders. In cetacean sanctuaries, each animal’s physical and mental well-being is the priority and the mission is to provide an environment where the cetacean residents can thrive.

Services provided 

Animal sanctuary services include spaying and neutering, hygiene, and physical well-being. These services are mainly performed by licensed veterinarians. Other positions that can be held by people at sanctuaries include specialized animal trainers, groomers, and volunteers. When it comes to new residents, they are typically not used to living with a large population of their kind and can be easily overwhelmed or agitated. Because of this, they can be held for a certain amount of time before being admitted to the general public. In this time, veterinarians study the new animal's behavioral and dietary habits and try for a smooth transition into the sanctuary's environment. Also, some species of animals, dogs for example, are social creatures. In isolation they get lonely and become depressed. Animal sanctuaries often accommodate these types of animals by putting them in living quarters where they're in groups or pairs that they fit well with. Enrichment activities are also available for the residents.

Accreditation

There are two primary organizations that provide accreditation and support for animal sanctuaries: the Global Federation of Animal Sanctuaries and the American Sanctuary Association. In the United States, sanctuaries must also be licensed by the United States Department of Agriculture (USDA) and regularly inspected by the Animal and Plant Health Inspection Service (APHIS) for compliance with the Animal Welfare Act.

See also
 List of animal sanctuaries
 Nature park
 Nature reserve
 Wildlife sanctuary
 Biosphere reserve

References

External links 

 American Sanctuary Association 
 Global Federation of Animal Sanctuaries 
Juliana’s Animal Sanctuary Official website
Microsanctuary Resource Center Official website
Sanctuaire pour Animaux de Ferme de l'Estrie Official website
VINE Sanctuary Official website

Animal welfare
 
Protected areas